Jyotsna Chandola is an Indian television and film actress known for playing Khushi Bharadwaj in Colors TV's Sasural Simar Ka.

Television

References

External links

Living people
Indian television actresses
Year of birth missing (living people)
Place of birth missing (living people)